Heydarabad (also Romanized as Ḩeydarābād and Heydarābād; also known as Bāgh-e Sohrāb) is a village in Banadkuk Rural District, Nir District, Taft County, Yazd Province, Iran. At the 2006 census, its population was 105, in 40 families.

References 

Populated places in Taft County